Callajoppa is a genus of parasitoid wasps belonging to the family Ichneumonidae.

The genus was first described by Cameron in 1903.

The species of this genus are found in Europe and Japan.

Species:
 Callajoppa cirrogaster
 Callajoppa exaltatoria

References

Ichneumonidae
Ichneumonidae genera